IF Verdandi is a sports club in Eskilstuna, Sweden, established in 1900. The club runs soccer, earlier also amateur wrestling, bandy, cycling, and table tennis. The men's bandy team played in the Swedish top division in 1932, 1933 and 1941.

The men's soccer team has played the Swedish second division during the seasons of 1942–1943, 1943–1944  and 1944–1945.

Kjell Johansson has played table tennis for the club.

References

External links
Official website 
Former website 

IF Verdandi
IF Verdandi
Defunct bandy clubs in Sweden
Defunct football clubs in Sweden
IF Verdandi
Association football clubs established in 1900
Bandy clubs established in 1900
Table tennis clubs in Sweden